The 2009 UCI World Ranking was the first edition of the ranking system launched by the Union Cycliste Internationale (UCI), replacing the rankings previously part of the UCI ProTour, with which it would be merged in 2011 to form the UCI World Tour.  The series started with the Tour Down Under's opening stage on 20 January, and consists of 13 stage races and 11 one-day races, culminating in the Giro di Lombardia on 17 October.  All events except the Tour Down Under took place in Europe.

The individual ranking was topped by Alberto Contador, who took the lead after his win in the Tour de France and was assured of winning the classification when second-placed Alejandro Valverde was absent from the final race of the series.

Events
All 24 events of the 2009 UCI ProTour were included in the series calendar, along with the three Grand Tours, two early season stage races, and five one-day classics.

Final standings

Individual

 267 riders scored at least one point on the 2009 UCI World Ranking.

Team
 Team rankings are calculated by adding the ranking points of the top five riders of a team in the table.

 34 teams have at least one point

Nation
Final standing. National rankings are calculated by adding the ranking points of the top five riders registered in a nation in the table. The top 10 nations after the 2009 Tour de Pologne became eligible to enter 9 riders to the 2009 UCI Road World Championships, and any nation with at least one rider in the top 100 eligible to enter a team of three.

Riders from 34 nations earned at least one point.
† The names of six riders under suspension for drug test failures, including Astarloza, Colom and Rebellin, were removed from the individual rankings, but the points earned before suspension are still credited to their teams and nations.

Leader progress

References

 
UCI World Ranking
UCI World Tour